The men's 10,000 metres walk event at the 1988 World Junior Championships in Athletics was held in Sudbury, Ontario, Canada, at Laurentian University Stadium on 29 July.

Medalists

Results

Final
29 July

Participation
According to an unofficial count, 25 athletes from 17 countries participated in the event.

References

10,000 metres walk
Racewalking at the World Athletics U20 Championships